Jan Gunnarsson and Michael Mortensen were the defending champions, but Gunnarsson did not compete this year. Mortensen teamed up with Magnus Tideman and lost in the quarterfinals to Ricki Osterthun and Tore Meinecke.

Stefan Edberg and Anders Järryd won the title by defeating Sergio Casal and Emilio Sánchez 6–0, 7–6(7–2) in the final.

Seeds

Draw

Draw

References

External links
 Official results archive (ATP)
 Official results archive (ITF)

Men's Doubles
Doubles